Nathan Anthony Richard Beaulieu (born December 5, 1992) is a Canadian professional ice hockey defenceman. He currently plays for the Anaheim Ducks of the National Hockey League (NHL). He was selected 17th overall in the 2011 NHL Entry Draft by the Montreal Canadiens.

In junior, Beaulieu helped the Saint John Sea Dogs win the 2011 Memorial Cup, and was named to the tournament's all-star team.

Playing career
Beaulieu was drafted by the Saint John Sea Dogs in the fourth round, 68th overall, of the 2008 Quebec Major Junior Hockey League (QMJHL) Midget Draft. When he began his junior career with the Sea Dogs in 2008, his father Jacques was the team's head coach.  His father was fired by the team and replaced with Gerard Gallant in 2009, an incident which caused Beaulieu to consider leaving the team. He decided to remain with Saint John after speaking with Gallant.

During the 2010–11 QMJHL season, Beaulieu established himself as a top prospect for the 2011 NHL Entry Draft, and was nominated for the Mike Bossy Trophy, awarded to the QMJHL's top professional prospect; he lost the award to Sean Couturier. Beaulieu was ranked fifth among North American skaters by the NHL Central Scouting Bureau in its final rankings, an improvement from his mid-season ranking of ninth. Saint John won the QMJHL championship and moved on to the 2011 Memorial Cup. Beaulieu scored the winning goal in the team's first game of the tournament against hosts Mississauga St. Michael's Majors. The Sea Dogs met the Majors again in the championship game of the tournament and won 3–1 to capture the Memorial Cup. After the tournament, Beaulieu was named to the Memorial Cup All-Star Team. The Sea Dogs win was the second Memorial Cup win for the Beaulieu family, as his father Jacques was an assistant coach with the London Knights when they won in 2005.

Beaulieu made his professional debut in the 2012–13 season with the Canadiens' American Hockey League (AHL) affiliate, the Hamilton Bulldogs. He later played his first NHL game with the Canadiens on March 30, 2013.

In his fifth season with the Canadiens in 2017–18, Beaulieu posted career highs in his second full NHL year, appearing in 74 games with 4 goals and 24 points.

As an impending restricted free agent from the Canadiens, on June 17, 2017, Beaulieu was traded by Montreal to the Buffalo Sabres in exchange for the Sabres' third-round pick in the 2017 NHL Entry Draft.  On July 31, 2017, he was signed to a two-year $4.8 million contract with the Sabres.

During his second season with the Sabres in 2018–19, Beaulieu's role was reduced and was regularly a healthy scratch. Through the mid-point of the season, Beaulieu requested to be traded due to his limited play while in a contract year. He remained with the team featuring in 30 games for 7 points before he was ultimately dealt by the Sabres at the trade deadline to the Winnipeg Jets for a six-round pick in the 2019 NHL Entry Draft on February 25, 2019.

With Beaulieu approaching arbitration rights as a restricted free agent the Jets declined to tender a qualifying offer, releasing him as a free agent on June 25, 2019. On July 1, 2019, Beaulieu opted to re-sign with the Jets on a cheaper one-year, $1 million contract. Later that season, on February 16, 2020, Beaulieu scored his first goal as a Winnipeg Jet- the game-winner- in a 3-2 home ice victory against the Chicago Blackhawks.

During his fourth year with the Jets, in the  season, Beaulieu was traded to the Pittsburgh Penguins in exchange for a conditional 2022 seventh-round draft pick on March 21, 2022.

As a free agent from the Penguins having not featured for the club, Beaulieu went un-signed over the summer. He initially joined the Anaheim Ducks on a professional tryout in preparation for the  season before agreeing to a one-year, $850,000 contract following a successful training camp on October 1, 2022.

Personal life
On April 27, 2013, Beaulieu—along with his father Jacques—were involved in an altercation in their hometown of Strathroy, Ontario. The incident in question took place following a charity golf tournament at a private residence and stemmed from property damages by the Beaulieus. As a result, two people were assaulted and suffered minor injuries. In August 2013, Beaulieu and his father pleaded guilty to assault. Each was assessed penalties of conditional discharges with nine months' probation, a joint recommendation from the Crown and the defence.

International play

Beaulieu participated at the 2012 World Junior Ice Hockey Championships held in Canada and won the bronze medal.

Career statistics

Regular season and playoffs

International

Awards and honours

References

External links

1992 births
Living people
Anaheim Ducks players
Buffalo Sabres players
Canadian ice hockey defencemen
Hamilton Bulldogs (AHL) players
Ice hockey people from Ontario
Montreal Canadiens draft picks
Montreal Canadiens players
National Hockey League first-round draft picks
People from Strathroy-Caradoc
San Diego Gulls (AHL) players
Saint John Sea Dogs players
Winnipeg Jets players